The Vrbana is a river in Central Bosnia, Bosnia and Herzegovina; with Ugar, the largest right tributary of the Vrbas. Its basin covers an area of approximately 703.5 km2. It has significant hydropower potential. There are many different estimations of the Vrbanja's length, from 70.5 km and 84 km to 95.4 km.

Name
Like many other sites in Bosnia, Vrbanja is named after the willows that grow along the river from Kruševo Brdo to Banja Luka. Other examples are Vrbanjci village and Vrbanja, near Banja Luka, as well as Vrbas and a bridge in the center of Sarajevo.

Geography
The Vrbanja source is on the slopes of Vlašić Mountain, upstream of Pilipovina village  (at about 1,530 meters above sea level). The area around the source is called "Prelivode", with a radius of around 2-3 kilometers. Prelivode is on a ridge between the Vlašić (1933 m) and Meokrnje (1425 m) mountains. 

The Vrbanja flows through Kruševo Brdo, Šiprage, Obodnik, Vrbanjci, Kotor Varoš, Zabrđe, Čelinac and the settlement of Vrbanja. It joins the Vrbas river in Banja Luka. 

During the Austro-Hungarian administration of 1878-1914, a wide network of railway communications was built along the Vrbanja, with the support of the Bosnian Government. Exploitation of the natural resources (especially wood and mining) was the primary intended purpose of this investment. The railroad was built along the valley of the Vrbanja from Kotor Varoš to Šiprage, where it branched along a few tributaries of the river. It leads to the area of the Riječice, across the pass between Jasen and Šepirice.

Tributaries 
The river is fed by numerous tributaries from Vlašić, Čemernica, Borja and Uzlomac mountains. The most significant right-side tributaries are the Bobovica, Lopača, Trnovac,  Crkvenica, Kruševica, Jezerka, Bosanka, and Jošavka, and the most significant left-side tributaries, the Čudnić, Ćorkovac, Demićka, Sadika, Grabovička rijeka, Duboka river, Vigošća/Vigošta, Cvrcka and Jakotina.

Vrbanja valley in war in Bosnia 
During the War in Bosnia  (1992 – 1995), Serbian Police and Army forces destroyed many of the surrounding Bosniak  and Croat villages along the Vrbanja valley, from Kruševo Brdo downstream to Banja Luka.  The local civilian population was killed or displaced and their homes and properties were destroyed.

Additional images

See also 
 Vrbas
 Vlašić
 Kruševo Brdo
 Šiprage
 Kotor Varoš
 Čelinac
 Banja Luka

References 

Rivers of Bosnia and Herzegovina